Bonzi or Bonzie may refer to:

 Bonzie Colson (born 1996), American basketball player
 Bonzi Wells (born 1976), American basketball player
 Benjamin Bonzi (born 1996), French tennis player
 Fausto Bonzi (born 1961), Italian former mountain runner
 Piero de Bonzi (1631–1703), Italian-French Roman Catholic cardinal
 Pietro Paolo Bonzi (c. 1576–1636), Italian painter
 BONZIE, American singer and songwriter Nina Ferraro (born 1995)
 Bonzi Records, American record label created by J. Wells

See also
 BonziBuddy, discontinued freeware virtual desktop assistant